La Fe (Spanish for "The Faith") is a Cuban village of the municipality of Sandino, in Pinar del Río Province. It is part of the consejo popular ("people's council") of Cayuco.

Geography
Located in a recess of the Guadiana Bay (Bahía de Guadiana), close to the Guanahacabibes Peninsula and its national park, it is one of the westernmost places in Cuba,  from Cape San Antonio, the island's western extremity.

Transport
The village counts a little port and a road linking it to the villages in Guanahacabibes peninsula.

References

External links

Populated places in Pinar del Río Province
Sandino, Cuba